Victor Alfonso Alcántara (born April 3, 1993) is a Dominican former professional baseball pitcher. He has played in Major League Baseball (MLB) for the Detroit Tigers.

Career

Los Angeles Angels
Alcántara signed with the Los Angeles Angels of Anaheim as an international free agent in May 2012. He made his professional debut with the Dominican Summer League Angels that year. He spent 2013 with the Orem Owlz of the Rookie-level Pioneer League and 2014 with the Burlington Bees of the Class A Midwest League. In 2014, he was selected to represent the Angels at the All-Star Futures Game. Alcántara started 2015 with the Inland Empire 66ers of the Class A-Advanced California League. The Angels added him to their 40-man roster after the season.

Detroit Tigers
After the 2016 season, the Angels traded Alcántara to the Detroit Tigers in exchange for Cameron Maybin. He pitched for the Erie SeaWolves of the Class AA Eastern League and the Toledo Mud Hens of the Class AAA International League. The Tigers promoted Alcántara to the major leagues on September 5, 2017, and made his major league debut that day. He cleared outright waivers on December 11, 2017.

2018 
Alcántara started the 2018 season with the Triple-A Toledo Mud Hens, and the Tigers called him up on July 5, 2018. He pitched 30 innings at the major league level in 2018, posting a 2.40 ERA with 21 strikeouts.

2019 
Alcántara made the team out of spring training in 2019 and earned the opening day win out of the bullpen against the Toronto Blue Jays. Alcántara was outrighted off the Tigers roster and elected free agency on October 24.

2020 
On February 21, 2020, Alcántara was suspended for 80 games for violating the major league drug program when he tested positive for the performance-enhancing substance Stanozolol.

See also
List of Major League Baseball players suspended for performance-enhancing drugs

References

External links

1994 births
Arkansas Travelers players
Burlington Bees players
Detroit Tigers players
Dominican Republic expatriate baseball players in the United States
Dominican Republic sportspeople in doping cases
Dominican Summer League Angels players
Erie SeaWolves players
Inland Empire 66ers of San Bernardino players
Living people
Major League Baseball pitchers
Major League Baseball players from the Dominican Republic
Major League Baseball players suspended for drug offenses
Orem Owlz players
Scottsdale Scorpions players
Sportspeople from Santo Domingo
Toledo Mud Hens players